Rishibala Naval, (born 4 April 1976), known mononymously as Simran is an Indian actress, producer, dancer and singer who works predominantly in Tamil films. She has also appeared in Telugu, Hindi, Malayalam and Kannada films. She is considered to be one of the most versatile actresses of her time and is recognized for her dancing skills. She is the recipient of numerous accolades including three Filmfare Awards South.

Simran joined the Indian film industry after being noticed as an anchor in the show Superhit Muqabla. She achieved early success with Tere Mere Sapne (1996). Subsequently, she made her debut in South Indian cinema through the Malayalam film Indraprastham (1996) and Kannada film Simhada Mari (1997). She won the inaugural Filmfare Award for Best Female Debut – South for her work in V. I. P. (1997) and Nerrukku Ner (1997) which was followed by a string of commercial successes early in her career. In 1999, Simran received critical praise in the Tamil films Thulladha Manamum Thullum and Vaali, establishing herself as the most successful actress in Tamil cinema at the time. In 2000, she played the role of an antagonist in Parthen Rasithen and a family girl who falls in premarital agreement in Priyamaanavale; both went on to become commercial and critical successes.

In 1998, Rediff called her "one of Tamil cinema's top female draws." In 2002, Simran played the mother of an adopted 9-year-old daughter in Kannathil Muthamittal and received her first Filmfare Award for Best Tamil Actress the following year. The same year she also appeared in two blockbuster comedy films; Pammal K. Sambandam and Panchathantiram. In Telugu, Simran starred in a series of commercially successful films; Samarasimha Reddy (1999), Kalisundam Raa (2000) and Narasimha Naidu (2001). Following the success of the 2004 sci fi film New, Simran became more selective about the projects she pursued during a time period that coincided with the birth of her two children. In 2008, she made a comeback to Tamil cinema with Vaaranam Aayiram which won her the Filmfare Award for Best Supporting Actress. In 2019, she was featured opposite Rajinikanth in Karthik Subbaraj's Petta which became the highest grossing film of her career. She reunited with R. Madhavan in Rocketry: The Nambi Effect, the latter's directional debut which earned her critical acclaim.

Early and personal life 
Simran was born Rishibala Naval on 4 April 1976 to Punjabi parents in Mumbai. Simran has two younger sisters, Monal and Jyothi Anand, and a younger brother Sumeet Naval.

Simran completed her schooling at St. Anthony’s high school and high schooling at Children Welfare Centre in Mumbai. She married Deepak Bagga, her childhood friend, on 2 December 2003. The couple has two sons.

Career

Debut and breakthrough (1995–1999) 
Simran made her debut in the 1995 film Sanam Harjai, the first Indian film to be shot in New Zealand. As a presenter on musical show Superhit Muqabla she was noticed by Jaya Bachchan who cast her in ABCL’s Tere Mere Sapne, in which she received praise for her performance in the song Aankh Maarey. She made her debut in Malayalam cinema with 1996’s Indraprastham, a movie that was unsuccessful but for which Simran received praise for her performance. In 1997 she made her Kannada and Telugu debuts in Simhada Mari and Abbai Gari Pelli.

In 1997 Simran also made her Tamil debut, and rose to stardom with V.I.P. For V.I.P. and another 1997 Tamil release, Nerrukku Ner, she would win the Filmfare Award for Best Female Debut – South. Her success in those films focused her career on the Tamil film industry.

Over the next two years, between 1998 and 1999, Simran was seen in 18 films. In Aval Varuvala she received positive acclaim with one reviewer stating that her performance showed “she can act”. She was the female lead in Natpukkaga which would go on to win the Filmfare Award for Best Film – Tamil and the Tamil Nadu State Film Award for Best Film.

In this time she was seen in the Hindi film Anari No.1 and the Telugu film Samarasimha Reddy, but it was her Tamil films that received the most attention. While there were some commercially unsuccessful films such as Ethirum Pudhirum and Time, most of her releases did well. Simran’s performance in Kanave Kalaiyadhe and Jodi were praised. During this period she was first seen with Prashanth in Kannedhirey Thondrinal. The commercial success of the film and their popularity as an onscreen pair meant that they would be seen together in several future films. Simran’s performance in the film Thulladha Manamum Thullum would garner her the Tamil Nadu State Film Award for Best Actress, and would lead to reviewers referring to her as being “among the leading actresses in Tamil films”. Her performance in Vaale won her the Cinema Express Award for Best Actress – Tamil.

Continued success (2000–2004) 
In 2000 Simran starred in the Telugu film Kalisundam Raa. The film would receive the National Film Award for Best Feature Film in Telugu and the Nandi Award for Best Feature Film. The acclaim led to her establishing more of a presence in the Telugu film industry.

The films Yuvaraju and Seema Simham were unsuccessful, however Simran continued to build her reputation. Daddy saw commercial success and Narasimha Naidu in particular received a lot of commercial and critical acclaim. In Nuvvu Vastavani, a Telugu remake of Thulladha Manamum Thullum in which Simran had starred, Simran reprised her role as the female lead. Simran was also seen in Hindi films such as Khauff in this time.

Throughout this period Simran continued a prolific career in the Tamil film industry. Paarthale Paravasam was commercially unsuccessful, though Simran’s performance was praised. I Love You Da and Udhaya were also the rare releases that were unsuccessful during this period. In general, though it was a time of notable success. Her performances in Unnai Kodu Ennai Tharuven and 12B were praised. Pammal K. Sambandam, Priyamaanavale, Thamizh, Arasu and New were all notable commercial successes.

Simran’s performance in Parthen Rasithen was notable because it was her first major role as an antagonist. Her performance was featured in JFW magazine's list of "5 Heroines Who Stunned Us By Playing Negative Roles". Indiaglitz.com also listed Simran's portrayal in their list of "The Super Villains of Tamil Cinema" and credited her for the success of the film. Panchatanthiram is considered a comedy cult classic.

Her most notable film in this period was the Tamil-language Kannathil Muthamittal. The film won the National Film Award for Best Feature Film in Tamil and the Cinema Express Award for Best Film – Tamil. Simran specifically won the Filmfare Award for Best Actress – Tamil, the Cinema Express Award for Best Actress – Tamil, and the ITFA Best Actress Award.

Becoming more selective and focus on television (2005 – 2013) 
After being seen in 74 films in the ten years since her debut, Simran became more selective in the projects that she pursued being seen in just ten films in this nine-year period. This period coincided with the birth of her two children.

Several of Simran’s Tamil projects were unsuccessful during this period including Kicha Vayasu 16, Seval, and Ainthaam Padai. However, Vaaranam Aayiram received widespread critical and commercial acclaim. The film won the National Film Award for Best Feature Film in Tamil and was nominated for the Filmfare Award for Best Film – Tamil. Simran specifically won the Filmfare Award for Best Supporting Actress – Tamil and the Vijay Award for Best Supporting Actress.

She continued her career in Telugu cinema with roles in Okka Magaadu and John Appa Rao 40 Plus. She was also seen in the Malayalam release Heart Beats.

During this period she pivoted to focus more on television. She acted in the eponymously tiled Jaya TV serial Simran Thirai. She starred in the Telugu soap opera, Sundarakanda. During this time she also started working on reality TV shows and game shows. She was a judge on Super Super, and in 2011 took over the anchor role on the long running Jaya TV show, Jackpot. Between 2013 and 2014 she starred in Agni Paravai, a Tamil-language soap opera.

Simran also ventured into production. She and her husband produced Dance Tamizha Dance, a Tamil show for Zee Tamizh, in which she was also a judge. They followed it up with a second production, Dance Tamizha Dance Little Masters, focused on under-14 performers from Tamil Nadu, with Simran continuing as a judge.

Petta and career expansion (2014 – Present) 
Simran returned to the big screen in 2014 with Aaha Kalyanam, a commercially successful Tamil remake of Band Baaja Baaraat. After a series of unsuccessful films such as Trisha Illana Nayanthara and Koditta Idangalai Nirappuga, she was widely believed to have made her comeback with 2018’s Seemaraja. She followed it up with Petta, which received critical and commercial acclaim, becoming the second highest grossing Tamil film of the year. She continued working as a producer, producing and starring in a Hindi music video.

In 2020 she made her streaming debut with Netflix’s first Tamil film, Paava Kadhaigal, receiving positive reviews. This was followed up with Mahaan which debuted on Amazon Prime Video after the pandemic meant that a theater release wouldn’t be possible. It received positive reviews with M Suganth of The Times of India praising Simran and her co-stars for “memorable performances that elevate the scenes and the film”.

Simran reunited with her Paarthale Paravasam and Kannathil Muthamittal co-star R. Madhavan in Rocketry: The Nambi Effect. It was filmed simultaneously in Tamil, Hindi and English languages. Simran’s performance received positive reviews with Avinash Ramachandran of Cinema Express noting that "Madhavan, Simran propel this compelling biopic". The film was screened for civil servants and politicians in the Parliament of India and is one of five nominated by India for the Academy Award for Best International Feature Film.

Simran was most recently seen in the Tamil-language science fiction action film Captain. In March 2022 Manoj Bajpayee announced that he had commenced shooting on Gulmohar, a Hindi-language film alongside Simran. It released on Disney+ Hotstar on 3 March 2023. On 16 March 2023 it was announced that Simran had joined the cast of Sabdham.

Endorsements
In March 2002, Simran signed a deal to endorse Fanta. In the same year, Jyoti Labs launched Jeeva soap with Simran to endorse the brand. On 4 June 2008, PepsiCo announced Simran as the new brand ambassador for Kurkure in the South Indian market. Simran also signed up as the brand ambassador for the low-calorie sugar substitute Sugar Free Gold by Cadila Healthcare.

She appeared in several TV commercials for General Mills’ Pillsbury Atta. Dabur signed a deal with her to have her endorse Dabur Sanitizer. Simran and her younger son appeared in an advertisement for Enfagrow A+. Other endorsements include Pothys’ silk sarees, Arun Ice Cream, Nac Jewelers, CavinKare’s Chinni Masala, Lion Dates, Manna Go Grains, and Sunfeast Supermilk. In 2022 she and her Rocketry co-star, R. Madhavan, appeared in a series of ads for Swiggy’s Instamart.

Awards and nominations

References

External links 
 

Actresses in Tamil cinema
Tamil Nadu State Film Awards winners
Filmfare Awards South winners
Actresses in Hindi cinema
Actresses in Telugu cinema
Actresses in Kannada cinema
Actresses in Malayalam cinema
Indian film actresses
Indian television actresses
20th-century Indian actresses
Recipients of the Kalaimamani Award
21st-century Indian actresses
International Tamil Film Award winners
Punjabi people
Living people
1976 births
Actresses from Mumbai
Actresses in Tamil television
Actresses in Hindi television
Actresses in Telugu television